The 1930 Jefferson  Lawyers football team was an American football team that represented Jefferson Law School in Dallas, Texas, (eventually known as Jefferson University by 1931) during the 1930 college football season. In its first season of intercollegiate football, Jefferson compiled a 1–3 record. Clyde Waller was the head coach and was succeeded by Buddie King for the last game. Frankie Estes was the team captain. The team played its home games at high school fields in Dallas.

Jefferson Law School was opened in 1919 originally as just a law school by Andrew J. Priest in downtown. One of its early faculty members was Judge Sarah T. Hughes. The school achieved some success training lawyers and had a high graduation rate. Jefferson was rebranded as Jefferson University in 1931 as it added additional colleges such as engineering, liberal arts, business, commerce, and secretarial training.
Its first intercollegiate football game was against Southwest Vocational College, located in the Oak Cliff section of Dallas. Jefferson won that first game 25–6, but finished its season with three losses.

Schedule

References

Jefferson Law School
Dixie Rebels football seasons
jefferson Law School Lawyers football